John Selwyn Calverley (middle name sometimes spelled Selwin; 4 July 1855 – 30 December 1900) was a British sailor who competed in the 1900 Summer Olympics in Le Havre, France. Calverley took the silver in the 20+ ton.

Calverley was born in Leeds, a member of the Calverley family of Oulton Hall. His father was Edmund Calverley and his mother, Isabella, was the daughter of Sir John Thomas Selwyn, 6th baronet Selwyn (or Selwin) and sister of the Conservative politician Henry Selwin-Ibbetson, 1st Baron Rookwood. In 1888 he married Sybil Disraeli, a niece of British prime minister Benjamin Disraeli, and they had two daughters:

Sybil Horatia Calverley (1889-1971)
Frances Mary Calverley (1896-1970)

References

External links

 

British male sailors (sport)
Sailors at the 1900 Summer Olympics – 20+ ton
Olympic sailors of Great Britain
1855 births
1900 deaths
Olympic silver medallists for Great Britain
Olympic medalists in sailing
Medalists at the 1900 Summer Olympics
Sportspeople from Leeds